Samuel García Cabrera (born 4 December 1991) is a Spanish track and field athlete specialising in the 400 metres. He represented his country in the 4 × 400 metres relay at the 2013 World Championships and won a bronze medal at the 2018 European Championships. Individually, his best outing so far is the seventh place at the 2014 European Championships.

His personal bests in the 400 metres are 45.00 seconds outdoors (Monachil 7 July 2017) and 46.35 seconds indoors (Salamanca 2017).

International competitions

References

External links
 
 
 
 
 

1991 births
Living people
People from Tenerife
Sportspeople from the Province of Santa Cruz de Tenerife
Spanish male sprinters
World Athletics Championships athletes for Spain
European Championships (multi-sport event) bronze medalists
European Athletics Championships medalists
Athletes (track and field) at the 2020 Summer Olympics
Olympic athletes of Spain